Robert, Bob, or Bobby Clark may refer to:

Television and film
Robert Clark (actor) (born 1987), American-born Canadian television actor
Bob Clark (1939–2007), Canadian filmmaker
Bob Clark (television reporter), retired American television reporter for the ABC network
Bobby Clark (juvenile actor) (1944–2021), American film and television actor
Bobby Clark (comedy actor) (1888–1960), vaudevillian, performed on stage, films, television, & the circus
Robert Clark (film executive) (1905–1984), Scottish film executive

Literature
Robert Clark (author) (born 1952), American novelist
Robert Clark (poet), see 1911 in poetry
Robert Clark (academic), co-founded The Literary Encyclopedia

Sports

Association football (soccer)
Robert Clark (footballer, born 1903) (1903–1970), English footballer for Liverpool F.C.
Bobby Clark (footballer, born 1945), Scottish footballer
Robert Clark (footballer, born 1962), Scottish association football player
 Bobby Clark (footballer, born 2005), English footballer

Baseball
Bob Clark (catcher) (1863–1919), American baseball player
Dell Clark (Robert Wardell Clark, 1891–1955), American baseball player
Bob Clark (pitcher) (1897–1944), American baseball pitcher
Bobby Clark (outfielder) (born 1955), American baseball outfielder

Other sports
Bob Clark (athlete) (1913–1976), American Olympic silver medalist in decathlon, 1936
Robert Clark (wrestler) (born 1939), Australian Olympic wrestler
Bobby Clark (Australian footballer) (born 1940), Australian rules footballer
Bobby Clark (rugby union) (born 1944), Scotland international rugby union player
Robert Clark (gridiron football) (born 1965), American football player

Politics
Robert Clark (Australian politician) (born 1957), member of the Victorian Legislative Assembly
Robert Clark (mayor), mayor of Lancaster, Pennsylvania, 1890–1894
Robert Clark (New York politician) (1777–1837), member of Congress from New York
Robert Curtis Clark (1937–2020), Canadian provincial level politician
Robert G. Clark Jr. (born 1928), American politician from Mississippi
Robert L. Clark (1872–?), member of the Wisconsin State Assembly

Science
Robert Clark (physicist), Australian Chief Defence Scientist and academic; involved in development of Kane quantum computer
Robert Selbie Clark (1882–1950), zoologist, biologist and crew member of Shackleton's Imperial Trans-Antarctic Expedition

Education
Robert C. Clark (born 1944), former Dean of Harvard Law School
Robert D. Clark (1910–2005), American university administrator
Robert E. Clark II, president of Wesley College, Dover, Delaware

Others
Robert Clark (businessman) (1924–2013), British naval officer and businessman
Robert Clark (exonerated convict), exonerated with help of the Georgia Innocence Project after 24 years in prison
Robert Clark (missionary) (1825–1900), British Church Missionary Society missionary
Robert Clark (naval architect), British yacht designer, designed British Steel
Robert Clark (photojournalist), American photojournalist; see Mem Nahadr
Bobby Clark (tenor) (?–2014), original member of the Southern Gospel Cathedral Quartet
Robert G. Clark (born 1959), U.S. businessman
Robert Peter Clark, a pseudonym of murderer John List
Robert Sterling Clark (1877–1956), American art collector, horse breeder and philanthropist
Robert T. Clark, retired U.S. Army general, commanded U.S. Fifth Army 2003–2006
Robert Indiana (1928–2018), American artist born Robert Clark
Robert Clark (priest) (1907–1998), Dean of Edinburgh

See also
Bert Clark (disambiguation)
Robert Clarke (disambiguation)
Robert Clerk (disambiguation)
Clark (surname)